Peter Leeuwenburgh (born 23 March 1994) is a Dutch professional footballer who plays as a goalkeeper for FC Groningen in the Eredivisie

Club career

Ajax
Leeuwenburgh joined Ajax from SHO, a local team from Oud-Beijerland, in 2004. He made his professional debut for the reserves team, Jong Ajax in a 4–2 Eerste Divisie win at Jong PSV on 2 September 2013.

On 4 June 2015, it was announced that Leeuwenburgh was sent on loan at FC Dordrecht for the 2015-16 season.

Cape Town City
On 26 July 2018, Leeuwenburgh signed for South African club Cape Town City on a three-year deal, playing in the Premier Soccer League, the top-tier in South African football.

Groningen
On 13 April 2021, it was announced that Leeuwenburgh would return to the Netherlands in the summer of 2021, to pry his trade at FC Groningen, where he will replace Sergio Padt.

Career statistics

Club

Honours
Ajax
 Eredivisie: 2013–14
 KNVB Cup: 20013–14
Johan Cruijff Shield: 2013

Jong Ajax
 Eerste Divisie: 2017–18

Cape Town City
MTN 8: 2018

Netherlands U-17
 UEFA European Under-17 Football Championship: 2011

References

External links
 Peter Leeuwenburgh Interview
 Netherlands profile

1994 births
Living people
People from Binnenmaas
Dutch footballers
Association football goalkeepers
AFC Ajax players
Jong Ajax players
FC Dordrecht players
Cape Town City F.C. (2016) players
FC Groningen players
Eredivisie players
Eerste Divisie players
Dutch expatriate footballers
Expatriate soccer players in South Africa
Dutch expatriate sportspeople in South Africa
Footballers from South Holland